Além Paraíba is a city in the southeastern Zona da Mata region of Minas Gerais, Brazil. The name indicates its position on the far bank (from Rio de Janeiro) of the Rio Paraíba do Sul. It was known as São José d'Além Parahyba until 1923.

Railways 
Além Paraíba was at the junction of the Estrada de Ferro Central do Brasil (1871) and the Estrada de Ferro Leopoldina (1873). The grand but somewhat ruinous main station (Porto Novo) now houses a small railway museum dedicated to the EF Leopoldina.

The Empreza Ferro Carril Além Parahyba followed in 1895 with a 4 km mule railway to Saúde which ran along the main streets and was electrified in 1925 but closed following a fatal accident in 1939. The tracks are still in existence.

Districts 
The city comprises the following districts:

 Banqueta
 Bela Vista
 Boiadeiro
 Esplanada
 Goiabal
 Granja
 Ilha Gama Cerqueira
 Ilha do Lazareto
 Ilha Recreio
 Jaqueira
 Jardim Paraíso
 Morro dos Cabritos
 Morro da Conceição
 Morro do Cipó
 Parada Breves
 Porto Novo
 Porto Velho
 Praça da Bandeira
 Santa Marta
 Santa Rita
 Santa Rosa
 São Geraldo
 São José
 São Sebastião
 Sítio Branco
 Terra do Santo
 Terreirão
 Timbira
 Vila Caxias
 Vila Laroca

See also 
Angustura, a town north of the city, a seat of a district belonging to the city of Além Paraíba.
 List of municipalities in Minas Gerais

References

Municipalities in Minas Gerais